The White Hart Inn is a grade II* listed public house in Blythburgh, Suffolk, England. It is a timber-framed former coaching inn and courthouse that dates from the mid-sixteenth century with later alterations.

References

External links

Grade II* listed pubs in Suffolk
Coaching inns
Timber framed buildings in Suffolk
Blythburgh